Hari Kumar Audichya (14 August 1930 – 17 September 2014) was an Indian politician of the Bharatiya Janata Party from Rajasthan. He was a member of Rajasthan Legislative Assembly from Kota and served as education minister of the state in 1980.

References

2014 deaths
Members of the Rajasthan Legislative Assembly
People from Kota, Rajasthan
1930 births
Bharatiya Janata Party politicians from Rajasthan